Free-trade zones in Dubai, (FTZs) are special economic zones set up with the objective of offering tax concessions and customs duty benefits to expatriate investors. There are more than 30 Free Zones operating in Dubai. FTZs in Dubai and the UAE are governed pursuant to a special framework of rules and regulations. A Free Zone Authority offers business licenses to foreign-owned businesses. Each Free Zone is designed around one or more industry categories and only offers licenses (e.g. for a Free Zone Enterprise (FZE)), to companies within those categories. Most of the free zones in Dubai broadly offer trading, services, and industrial licenses to investors looking to set up their businesses.

Background
Free zones in Dubai are managed and operated by the relevant authority. For instance, the Jebel Ali Free Zone Authority in Dubai is responsible for managing, operating and supervising the Jebel Ali Free Zone, one of the largest seaport free zones in Dubai. It has a subsidized rate of 32 percent on the country's Foreign Direct Investment (FDI). As for other Free Zones in Dubai, the Dubai Multi Commodities Centre (DMCC) has 7,330 active registered companies (as per 2013), offers a retention rate of 94 percent, and estimates an application of over 200 companies every year. the Dubai International Financial Centre (DIFC) is another jurisdiction demonstrating the growth of expansion. It contributes 12 percent to the GDP of Dubai and has an estimated a growth rate of 27 percent (as per 2015). The authorities speculate that the region will triple in size by 2024. Others include the Dubai Airport Freezone (DAFZA; the Dubai internet City; and the Dubai Media city. In April 2021 Dubai CommerCity launched, a free zone dedicated to e-Commerce. The International Free Zone Authority (IFZA) is one of the most cost-effective and fastest-growing free trade zone in Dubai. This freezone was founded in Fujairah Emirate and has moved to Dubai Silicon Oasis (DSO), Dubai.

List
There are more than 20 Free Zones operating in Dubai, which include the following:

Dubai Airport Free Zone
Dubai CommerCity
Dubai Design District
Dubai Gold and Diamond Park
Dubai Healthcare City
Dubai International Academic City
Dubai Internet City
Dubai International Financial Centre
Dubai Logistic City
Dubai Knowledge Park
Dubai Maritime City
Dubai Media City
Dubai Multi Commodities Centre (DMCC)
Dubai Production City
Dubai Science Park
Dubai Silicon Oasis
Dubai Studio City
Dubai Textile City
Dubai World Central (Dubai South)
Dubai World Trade Centre
International Humanitarian City
Jebel Ali Free Zone
Meydan Free zone

See also

 List of Free Trade Zones in UAE
 List of company registers
 List of offshore financial centres
 List of financial districts

References

Economy of Dubai
Geography of Dubai
Neighbourhoods in the United Arab Emirates

Free trade zones